The Tokelau self-determination referendum of 2006, supervised by the United Nations, was held from February 11 to February 15, 2006. The defeated proposal would have changed Tokelau's status from an unincorporated New Zealand territory to a self-governing state in free association with New Zealand, akin to the Cook Islands and Niue.

After 581 of the 615 eligible voters cast a proper ballot (3 ruined ballots were also cast), the referendum fell 38 votes short of the two-thirds majority required to succeed in a change of status.

The majority of Tokelauans reside in New Zealand, and were ineligible to vote in the referendum, in line with standard practice in United Nations mandated votes on self-determination. However concerns among this community may have influenced those who were eligible to vote, thereby contributing to the referendum's failure.

The passage of the referendum would have removed Tokelau from the United Nations list of non-self-governing territories, as the Cook Islands and Niue were removed from this list when they were granted self-governance in 1965 and 1974, respectively.

Outgoing Tokelau Ulu (head of government) Pio Tuia suggested in February 2006 that since the vote failed to pass by such a small margin, the issue was likely to be revisited in a few years' time. In June 2006, his successor Kolouei O'Brien announced that the Fono had agreed to hold a similar referendum again in late 2007 or early 2008; in the end, it was decided to hold a second referendum on self-determination in October 2007.

An unintended result of the United Nations' recent efforts to promote decolonization in Tokelau has been the re-emergence of a Tokelauan claim to Swains Island, which is legally part of American Samoa, hitherto a somewhat dormant issue.

Voting schedule

Results
The proposal: "Do you agree that Tokelau become a self-governing state in Free Association with New Zealand on the basis of the Constitution and as in the draft Treaty notified to Tokelau? ".

References

Referendums in Tokelau
Tokelau
Self-determination referendum
2006 elections in Oceania
2006 in international relations
Tokelau
Separatism in New Zealand